Fan Hill is a mountain located in the Catskill Mountains of New York northeast of North Kortright. Streeter Hill is located west-northwest, and Middle Brook Hill is located northeast of Fan Hill.

References

Mountains of Delaware County, New York
Mountains of New York (state)